Pathrail Union is a union parishad of Delduar Upazila, Tangail District, Bangladesh. It is situated at 6 km south of Tangail.

Demographics

According to Population Census 2011 performed by Bangladesh Bureau of Statistics, The total population of Pathrail union is 31803. There are 7098 households in total.

Education

The literacy rate of Pathrail Union is 50.5% (Male-54.8%, Female-46%).

See also
 Union Councils of Tangail District

References

Populated places in Dhaka Division
Populated places in Tangail District
Unions of Delduar Upazila